Growell India is a multinational feed additive company headquartered in Pune, Maharashtra, India. Growell India manufactures and exports phytogenic feed additives for livestock. The company is a pioneer in phytogenic feed additives and has established a strong presence worldwide since its inception in 1995.

Growell India operates a production facility in Pune, India, markets products in over 40 countries and conducts primary and applied research in various prestigious Universities, Veterinary colleges and research centres worldwide. Main markets are Central and Eastern Europe, South Korea, India, Australia and New Zealand. Growell India is the only Indian origin feed additive manufacturer which is FAMI-QS certified. FAMI-QS certified companies

History
1994 Phytogenic / Botanically derived feed additive research begins in India through various Veterinary Colleges, Research Laboratories and Field Trials
1996 Growell India is founded in Pune, India and the production facility is opened
1998 Growell India registered as Manufacturer Exporter with Ministry of Commerce & Industry, Govt. of India, India
1998 First Export to New Zealand for Calves and Free range Layer Birds
1999 Products registered and First consignment shipped to Taiwan
2000 Experimentations of field and in the laboratory of immuno-stimulant nutrient - Growell in Italy
2000 First consignment shipped to Italy
2001 Laboratory trials on Broilers carried out in USA by Virginia Scientific Research, Inc. by Michael D. Sims and Danny M. Hooge
2002 Products registered in Mexico & First shipment to Mexico
2003 Products registered in Australia
2003 University trials in Brazil by universidade federal do paraná - Natural Anticoccidian (Coxynil) for broilers
2004 First consignment shipped to Australia
2004 Products registered and First consignment shipped to Turkey
2004 Growell India is certified ISO 9001:2000 for Premixtures & Natural Animal Feed Supplements
2005 Denmark, Bulgaria  & South Korea exports started after conducting local trials
2006 Research studies published on Coxynil vs. Ionophores Anticoccidials 
2007 Entry into Middle East markets through Lebanon & Syria
2009 FAMI QS http://www.fami-qs.org/ accredited, Spain markets started

Products
Growell India manufactures and exports phytogenic feed additives such as Coxynil, Growell, Respowell, Wormnil, Feedadd and Blendall.

Research
Research conducted by Growell India reveals that coccidiosis burdens the livestock industry with $3 billion in annual expenses due to impaired growth rates, disease, infertility, and morbidity. Subclinical coccidiosis is often undetected by farmers, though it causes havoc on animal health and productivity.  
Coccidiosis is caused by Eimeria. Its life cycle completes in a week. Active "oocysts" are picked up by the bird (or other livestock) and swallowed. An "oocyst" is a capsule with a thick wall protecting the parasites. They "sporulate" and then become infective. The disease-causing oocyst is a hard and persistent structure resistant to chemical damage and degradation. They remain after treatment with diluted sodium hypochlorite or sulfuric acid. An unsporulated oocyst can survive up to seven months in fecal tissue, and a sporulated oocyst 2 years in an exogenous environment.

The oocyst must be attacked from multiple layers as it is formed of two walls: proteins and lipids. These make up its resilience. Medications used for coccidian infections are anticoccidial drugs – either coccidiostatic or coccidiocidal agents. Once they are withdrawn, the offending parasites’ life cycle continues. If the oocyst cannot sporulate, disease is halted. Coxynil can inhibit sporulation of oocysts by Interfering with male schizomy, making male schizonts infertile and then changing intestinal environment, prohibiting fertilization. Original research proves that coxynil does not let the oocysts sporulate thereby controlling coccidiosis.

Further reading
 Indian Journal of Experimental Biology - Evaluation of herbal Coccidiostat 'coxynil' in broiler
 Dept. of Pathology, Bombay Veterinary College, Parel, Mumbai, India - A herbal coccidiostat on pathology of coccidiosis in broilers - Effect of Coxynil
 Viral & Bacterial Diseases in Beef & Dairy Cattle – Natural Products
 Handbook on Herbal Drugs and its Plant Sources
 Korean Society of Life Science - Effect of Dietary Plant Extracts (Coxynil®, Growell®, Respowell®) in Broilers - Journal of Life Science

References

External links
 Official website

Animal feed companies of India
Manufacturing companies based in Pune
1996 establishments in Maharashtra
Indian companies established in 1996